The 1841 Alabama gubernatorial election took place on August 2, 1841, in order to elect the governor of Alabama. Term started on November 22, 1841. Democrat Benjamin Fitzpatrick won his first term as Governor with 56.9% of the vote.

Candidates

Democratic Party
Benjamin Fitzpatrick, candidate for the 1837 election but lost in the primary.

Independent Whig
James W. McLung

Election

References

Alabama gubernatorial elections
1841 Alabama elections
Alabama
August 1841 events